Annemasse station is a railway station located in Annemasse, Haute-Savoie, south-eastern France. The station was opened in 1880 and is located on the Aix-les-Bains–Annemasse railway, Longeray-Léaz-Le Bouveret railway, and CEVA orbital railway. It was formerly the eastern terminus of the Annemasse-Genève-Eaux-Vives railway. The train services are operated by SNCF and Léman Express.

Services
 the following services stop at Annemasse:

References

External links
 
 
 Timetable Leman Express 

Railway stations in Haute-Savoie
Railway stations in France opened in 1880